The Military Planning and Conduct Capability (MPCC) is a permanent operational headquarters (OHQ) at the military strategic level for military operations of up to 2500 troops (i.e. the size of one battle group) deployed as part of the Common Security and Defence Policy (CSDP) of the European Union (EU) by the end of 2020. Since its inception in 2017, the MPCC has commanded three non-executive training missions in Somalia, Mali and the Central African Republic, and will organise the training of Ukrainian forces on EU soil.

The MPCC is part of the EU Military Staff (EUMS), a directorate-general of the European External Action Service (EEAS), and the Director General of the EUMS also serves as Director of the MPCC - exercising command and control over the operations.

Through the Joint Support Coordination Cell (JSCC), the MPCC cooperates with its civilian counterpart, the Civilian Planning and Conduct Capability (CPCC).

The MPCC is situated in the Kortenberg building in Brussels, Belgium, along with a number of other CSDP bodies.

History

2016-2020: MPCC established for non-executive missions
In 2016, the European Union Global Strategy was adopted a British referendum was held and resulted in favour of UK withdrawal (Brexit).  In its November 2016 Conclusions on implementing the Global Strategy in the area of security and defence, the Council of the EU invited High Representative Morgherini to propose ‘a permanent operational planning and conduct capability at the strategic level for non-executive military missions’ under political control and strategic direction of the Political and Security Committee (PSC).

On 8 June 2017, the Council of the European Union (EU) decided to establish a Military Planning and Conduct Capability (MPCC), albeit not permitted to run executive missions in order to avoid a British veto.

A non-executive military mission is defined as an operation conducted in support of a host nation which has an advisory role only. In comparison to an executive military operation which is mandated to conduct actions in replacement of the host nation. Combat operations would fall into this category.

2020-: First mandate extension
EU officials have indicated that a review in 2018 might extend the MPCC's mandate to also include operations with combat elements - or so-called executive missions. Diplomats have also indicated that the MPCC will be 'rebranded' as the EU's Operational Headquarters (OHQ) after the British withdrawal from the Union, which was scheduled to happen on 31 October 2019. On 20 November 2018 the MPCC's mandate was expanded to include executive operations (i.e. with combat elements) also by the end of 2020. As such, the MPCC takes over role of the previous European Union Operations Centre (EU OPCEN).

Second mandate extension
A further review of the MPCC's roles and responsibilities has also been agreed with a view to completion by the end of 2020. It is expected that the review will recommend the expansion of the MPCC's role even further and establish it as the EU military planning HQ that several member states have long hoped for and the UK has always opposed.

This should be seen in connection with a Permanent Structured Cooperation project titled Strategic Command and Control System for CSDP Missions and Operations. This aims to "improve the command and control systems of EU missions and operations at the strategic level. Once implemented, the project will enhance the military decision-making process, improve the planning and conduct of missions, and the coordination of EU forces. The Strategic Command and Control (C2) System for CSDP Missions will connect users by delivering information systems and decision-making support tools that will assist strategic commanders carry out their missions. Integration of information systems would include intelligence, surveillance, command and control, and logistics systems."

Structure

The MPCC is a single military strategic command and control structure, responsible for the operational planning and conduct of military missions of up to 2500 troops. This includes the building up, deployment, sustaining and recovery of EU forces. The MPCC will at present control the three EU training missions in Central African Republic, Mali and Somalia.

The MPCC will be reporting to the Political and Security Committee (PSC), and informing the EU Military Committee (EUMC). The MPCC will also cooperate with its existing civilian counterpart, the Civilian Planning and Conduct Capability (CPCC), through a Joint Support Coordination Cell (JSCC).

The MPCC has a maximum of 60 personnel, in addition to personnel seconded from member states.

Director

The Director General of the EUMS also serves as the Director of the MPCC and in that capacity assume the function of the single commander for all non-executive military missions, exercising command and control over the current three training Missions and other possible future non-executive military Missions.

The current three Mission Commanders will become ‘Mission Force Commanders’ who will act under the command of the Director of the MPCC and will remain responsible for exercising military command authority on the ground. The Director of the MPCC will assume the same role, tasks and command relationships as those attributed to a military Operation Commander (OpCdr). He will also exercise the responsibilities related to deployment and recovery of the missions as well as overall budgeting, auditing and reporting.

See also

Common Security and Defence Policy
European External Action Service
European Union Military Staff
Civilian Planning and Conduct Capability
List of military and civilian missions of the European Union
Allied Command Operations of the North Atlantic Treaty Organization
Supreme Headquarters Allied Powers Europe

References

Further reading
A permanent headquarters under construction? The Military Planning and Conduct Capability as a proximate principal, Yf Reykers
The EU Military Staff: a frog in boiling water?, Militaire Spectator

External links
EU defence cooperation: Council establishes a Military Planning and Conduct Capability (MPCC), Council of the European Union
Factsheet 2017
Factsheet 2018
EU military HQ to take charge of Africa missions, EUobserver

European Union Military Staff
Joint military headquarters